Neatham is a Roman hamlet in the civil parish of Alton in the East Hampshire district of Hampshire, England.

History

Roman period – Vindomis 
The lost Roman settlement of Vindomis is believed to be at Neatham. Its strategic importance lay in its being at the crossing of important roads: one from Winchester towards London and the other from Chichester to Silchester, a large Roman town to the north of present-day Basingstoke. The name Vindomis might be translated as ‘(The mansio) of the wine country’ (although this may equally be a Celtic name, with the prefix VINDO-'white'). Vindomis may well have been the administrative centre of a large estate associated with the potteries. The population at this time is estimated at have been 2,500.

Saxon period – Neatham 
After the Romans left, it became a Saxon settlement, called Neatham, indicating the presence of a cattle market. For several centuries, Neatham remained the chief place in the area and the focal point of Neatham Hundred, which included a large part of north-east Hampshire.

Norman period 
At the time of the Domesday Book in 1085, Neatham was recorded as belonging to the Crown and it included 96 households. Neatham Hundred included 24 other places. After the founding of Waverley Abbey in 1128, King Steven made a gift of Neatham for the Abbey to establish a Grange and an Oratory, with a community of 12 monks, independent of the parish of Holybourne. Eventually, Neatham was eclipsed by Alton and, in the 12th century, the area was renamed the Alton Hundred.

Tudor period 
When Henry VIII dissolved the monasteries, Neatham went into lay hands and became part of the parish of Binsted.

Modern day 
In the 1980s, Neatham elected to be joined to Holybourne. Neatham is now a hamlet comprising a Manor House, a Grange, a mill, and a dozen cottages. Today, the hamlet lies along the Alton bypass between Alton and Farnham. Its Grade I buildings and mills still remain.

Notable buildings 
Neatham Grange
 Mill House (C.19)
Upper Neatham Mill
 Mill House. Possible C.18 or earlier.
 Barn
 Neatham Mill
 Mill and Barn . Mostly C.19.
 Dovecote C.18
Neatham Manor
 Manor House Possible C.18.
 Dovecote C.16/17

References

External links 
 VINDOMIS? Minor Romano-British Settlement: Neatham, Hampshire?
 Neatham
 PROPOSED CONSERVATION AREAS AT LOWER NEATHAM MILL AND ISINGTON

Villages in Hampshire
Alton, Hampshire